James L. Axtell (born December 20, 1941 in Endicott, New York) is an American historian. He was a professor of history at the College of William and Mary in Williamsburg, Virginia.  Axtell, whose interests lie in American Indian history and the history of higher education, was the William R. Kenan, Jr. Professor of Humanities. He was elected a Fellow of the American Academy of Arts and Sciences in 2004. Axtell retired at the end of the spring 2008 semester, although he taught a class at Princeton University in the fall of 2009.

Books

: History Book Club; Gilbert Chinard Prize, Society for French Historical Studies, 1985; Erminie Wheeler-Voegelin Prize, American Society for Ethnohistory, 1986; Albert B. Corey Prize, American Historical Association-Canadian Historical Association, 1986

 Wisdom′s Workshop. The Rise of the Modern University. Princeton University Press, Princeton, New Jersey 2016, .

References

External links
Professor Axtell's personal homepage and curriculum vitae

1941 births
Alumni of Trinity College, Cambridge
College of William & Mary faculty
Fellows of the American Academy of Arts and Sciences
Living people
Northwestern University faculty
People from Endicott, New York
Princeton University faculty
Yale University alumni
Yale University faculty
21st-century American historians
21st-century American male writers
Historians from New York (state)
American male non-fiction writers